The Skatepark Project, formerly the Tony Hawk Foundation, is a skateboarding organization that helps communities build public skate parks for youth in underserved communities.

Organization history 
Founded in 2002 as the Tony Hawk Foundation, The Skatepark Project has built over 600 skateparks worldwide.

In 2020, the Tony Hawk Foundation changed its name to The Skatepark Project to better describe the organization's mission.

References

External links
The Skatepark Podcast - presented by The Skatepark Project

Skateboarding organizations
501(c)(3) organizations
Social welfare charities based in the United States
Sports charities
Sports foundations based in the United States